Cotabato State University or CotSU  formerly Cotabato City State Polytechnic College is a government-funded higher education institution located in Cotabato City, Philippines. It is mandated to provide professional and advanced vocational instruction and training in agriculture, fisheries, forestry, science and technology, engineering, and industrial technologies. It is also mandated to promote research, advanced studies, and progressive leadership in its field of specialization.  Its main campus is located in Cotabato City.

In April 2021, the Republic Act 10585 an act converting Cotabato City State Polytechnic College into Cotabato State University was fully implemented.

References

State universities and colleges in the Philippines
Universities and colleges in Cotabato City